Cheektowaga Central Free School District is a school district in Cheektowaga, New York, United States. The current superintendent is Steven L. Wright.

The district operates three schools: Cheektowaga High School, Cheektowaga Middle School, and Union East Elementary School.

Administration 
The District offices are located 3600 Union Road in Cheektowaga. The current Superintendent is Steven L. Wright.

District history 
The town of Cheektowaga had many multiple districts. In 1956, five districts (Union, Losson, Pine Hill, Alexander, and Cayuga) merged to form the new Cheektowaga Central School District.

Former Superintendents 
Previous assignment and reason for departure denoted in parentheses
Earl J. Boggan–1956-1969 (Principal - Pine Hill High School, retired, named Coordinator of Secondary Education of D'Youville College)
Omer Renfrow–1969-1976 (Principal - Thornton Township High School, retired)
Andrew P. Mulligan–1976-1987 (unknown, retired)
Leslie B. Lewis–1987-2003 (Principal - Cheektowaga Junior/Senior High School, retired)
Delia Bonenberger–2003-2010 (Assistant Superintendent - Cheektowaga Central School District, retired)
Dennis M. Kane–2010-2016 (Assistant Superintendent - Cheektowaga Central School District, retired)

Cheektowaga Central High School 

Cheektowaga Central High School is located at 3600 Union Road and serves grades 9 through 12. The current principal is Scott Zipp.

History 
The first secondary school in Cheektowaga was Pine Hill High School, erected in 1921 at 1635 East Delavan Avenue. This school operated for forty years before the current Cheektowaga Central High School was constructed and opened in 1960. The high school housed grades 7-12 before the opening of Central Middle School in 1989 in an adjacent wing of the high school.

Former principals 
Previous assignment and reason for departure denoted in parentheses
Charles S. Allgeier–1960-1969 (Vice Principal - Depew High School, retired)
Bertha K. Dauer–1969-1977 (Vice Principal - Cheektowaga Junior/Senior High School, retired)
Leslie Lewis–1977-1987 (Vice Principal - Cheektowaga Junior/Senior High School, named Superintendent of Cheektowaga Central School District)
Robert C. D'Angelo–1987-1989 (Assistant Principal - Royalton-Hartland High School, named Assistant Principal of Pembroke Junior/Senior High School)
James G. Christmann–1989-1993 (Assistant Principal - Kensington High School, named Principal of Pine Hill Middle School)
George W. Radka–1993-2000 (Principal - Cheektowaga Middle School, retired)
Steven L. Wright–2000-2007 (Vice Principal - Cheektowaga Junior/Senior High School, named Director of Pupil Personnel Services for Cheektowaga Central Schools)
Susan L. Cain–2007-2014 (Assistant Principal - Cheektowaga Central High School, retired)

Cheektowaga Middle School 

Cheektowaga Central Middle School is located at 3600 Union Road and serves grades 5 through 8. The current principal is Micah Hanford.

History 
Cheektowaga Central Middle School was formed in 1989. Previously, grades 7 and 8 were housed at Cheektowaga High School. From 1993-2003, both the high and middle school shared principals and other staff until the middle school was reborn in 2003. An addition was built onto the east wing of the school to accommodate the new middle school in 2003.

Union East Elementary School 

Union East Elementary School is located at 3550 Union Road and serves grades K through 4. The current principal is Melissa Mitchell.

History 
Union East was constructed and opened in 1968.

Defunct Schools

Pine Hill Education Center 

Pine Hill Education Center was located at 1635 East Delavan and serves grades PK through 12

History 
Pine Hill was opened as an elementary school in 1960 at the site of the former Pine Hill High School. After several years, Pine Hill High School was demolished and the current Pine Hill school was constructed in its place. The new building's defining feature was the "open classroom" design which allowed for greater student interaction between classrooms. It began as an elementary school, later became a middle school for grades five and six, before finally switching to primary grades. The primary school closed in 2011, and the building now houses the district's alternative education program. The alternative program, opened in 2011, serves students who are referred from the Cheektowaga Middle and High Schools in needed of a smaller, more structured learning environment.

In 2018, the school was closed and the alternative education program was moved to the high school campus. The building now houses the EDGE Academy from Erie 1 BOCES.

Former Principals 
Previous assignment and reason for departure denoted in parentheses
Robert J. Schlageter–1960-1986 (Principal - Losson Road School, retired)
Frank G. Cantie–1986-1993 (4th grade teacher - Union East Elementary School, retired)
James G. Christmann–1993-1994 (Principal - Cheektowaga High School, named Principal of Royalton-Hartland High School)
Alison Caputy–1994-1995 (Teacher - Charlotte Cross Elementary School, named Principal of Union East Elementary)
Kathleen Rudewicz–1995-2000 (Assistant Principal - Union East Elementary, named Principal of Union East Elementary)
Alison Caputy–2000-2009 (Principal - Union East Elementary, retired)
Steven Wright–2009-2018 (Director of Pupil Personnel Services - Cheektowaga Central School District, named Chief Technology Officer or Cheektowaga Central School District)

References

External links

Education in Erie County, New York
School districts in New York (state)